NSB Di 4 is a class of five diesel-electric locomotives built by Henschel for the Norwegian State Railways (NSB). Delivered in 1981, the class is used to haul passenger trains on the Nordland Line and are since 2001 the only revenue diesel locomotives used by NSB. The locomotives had electric components from Brown, Boveri & Cie and a General Motors Electro-Motive Division 16-645E prime mover.

The locomotives were ordered in the late 1970s as a supplement and later replacement of the Di 3. The class is technically similar to Denmark's DSB Class ME; it was planned to have commonalities with NSB's electric El 17 locomotives, but this was scrapped. The Di 4 was world's first asynchronous locomotive in revenue service. A second batch was planned delivered later in the 1980s, but the order was never placed.



History

During the 1950s and 1960s, NSB took delivery of thirty-five Di 3 locomotives. The long-term plan during the 1960s called for an additional orders of Di 3s during the early 1970s, but this was never carried through. Instead, the state railways started planning of a new class. Construction was conducted by Kassel, Germany–based Henschel. The electric components were delivered by Brown, Boveri & Cie of Mannheim, Germany, while the engine-generator was delivered by General Motors. The Di 4 is technically similar to the Class ME procured by DSB in Denmark. Di 4 was the first NSB locomotive to have three-phase and asynchronous motors, and the world's first asynchronous locomotive in revenue service. Henschel was also building the NSB El 17; the two types were planned to use the same traction motors and rectifiers to increase commonality. This was however was discarded because the Di 4's components were too heavy for the El 17.

Delivery of the five locomotives took place in 1981. It was often run in multiple with Di 3. Di 4 has a higher axle load than Di 3, so from the delivery they could not be used north of Mo i Rana on the Nordland Line. By 1987, NSB was planning on an additional order of the class, with delivery in 1989 and 1990, but the order was never placed. The proposed order would have consisted of six to ten units, which would have received a modified ventilation system and a more powerful engine. Because of the time that had passed before a new order would have been placed, NSB was already looking for a more modern class, and placed an order for twelve Di 6 in 1992. The Di 6 proved too unreliable, and was returned to the manufacturer. With the retirement of the Di 3 in 2001, Di 4 remains NSB's only revenue diesel locomotives.

Specifications

The prime mover has a displacement of
The locomotives have a Co′Co′ wheel arrangement, with six Norsk Elektrisk & Brown Boveri QD 335N4A traction motors.

The wheel diameter is  when new.

References

Bibliography

External links 
NSB Di 4 profile on Trainspo

Di 4
Di 4
Diesel-electric locomotives of Norway
Henschel locomotives
Railway locomotives introduced in 1981
Co′Co′ locomotives
Nordland Line
Standard gauge locomotives of Norway